Austin Russell may refer to:
Austin Lee Russell, better know by his stage name Chumlee (born 1982), American reality television personality
Austin Russell (entrepreneur), founder of Luminar Technologies